St. Louis Argus is an African-American-oriented weekly newspaper founded in 1912 by brothers Joseph Everett Mitchell and William Mitchell. It began as a newsletter for an insurance company named Western Union Relief Association. The Argus is the oldest continuous black business in St. Louis, Missouri.

The name, Argus, refers to Argus Panoptes - a creature from Greek mythology with a hundred eyes that never closed at the same time.  The newspaper was to be a never-sleeping crusader. It watched the goings-on in the African-American community and published the stories that would also help the influx of southern blacks who were pouring into St. Louis deal with the "vagaries" of northern segregation.

One primary goal of the St. Louis Argus was to organize the Negro community for political action. The editors of the St. Louis Argus promised its readers that it would be moderate, fair, and fearless in its journalistic efforts.  The newspaper championed better schools, educational opportunities, and full civil rights for blacks.

The Argus earned the coveted Russwurm award, named for John Brown Russwurm, one of the founders of the first black newspaper, Freedom’s Journal, which launched in 1827.

From humble beginnings as an insurance company newsletter, the St. Louis Argus was built into a professional newspaper by J. E. Mitchell, William Mitchell and their partners. The St. Louis Argus newspaper and its publishing company made great strides. The St. Louis community perceived the newspaper as reliable and its publishers and editors as leaders. J. E. Mitchell, especially, was a recognized leader in the field of black journalism and in the city of St. Louis.

External links
 St. Louis Argus website
 The St. Louis Argus 1915-1926 Collection at the Internet Archive

References

Saint Louis Argus
Saint Louis Argus
African-American history in St. Louis
Saint Louis Argus
1912 establishments in Missouri